Decker Glacier is a steep, narrow glacier that drains the northeast slopes of Mount Newall in the Asgard Range, Victoria Land. It was named by the Advisory Committee on Antarctic Names for Chief Aviation Machinist's Mate William D. Decker, U.S. Navy, of Squadron VXE-6, who died at McMurdo Station on October 11, 1971.

See also
 List of glaciers in the Antarctic
 Glaciology

References

Glaciers of the Asgard Range
Glaciers of McMurdo Dry Valleys